Zétény Dombi (born 10 January 1975) is a Hungarian sprinter. He competed in the men's 4 × 400 metres relay at the 2000 Summer Olympics.

References

1975 births
Living people
Athletes (track and field) at the 2000 Summer Olympics
Hungarian male sprinters
Olympic athletes of Hungary
Place of birth missing (living people)
20th-century Hungarian people